Gabriel Ucar (born 12 March 1982) is a Swedish former professional footballer who played as a defender.

Ucar grew up in Landskrona, a town in Scania, Sweden and became an own product for Landskrona BoIS. He was among the players who in 2001 got his club promoted from Superettan to the top Swedish league Allsvenskan. He left Landskrona BoIS for Assyriska FF in middle of the 2004 season.

He spent time on trial at Irish side Derry City in 2008.

Ucar has also represented the Sweden under-21 side, earning a total of 9 caps.

References

External links 
 

1982 births
Living people
Swedish footballers
Allsvenskan players
Landskrona BoIS players
Assyriska FF players
Ängelholms FF players
Östers IF players
Association football defenders
People from Landskrona Municipality
Footballers from Skåne County